Kinston is a town in Coffee County, Alabama, United States. At the 2020 census, the population was 580.  It is part of the Enterprise Micropolitan Statistical Area.

History
On March 10, 2009, in the Alabama towns of Kinston, Samson and Geneva, Michael McLendon went on a shooting rampage, killing ten people and wounding six more before committing suicide.

Geography
Kinston is located in the southwest corner of Coffee County at  (31.220503, -86.170782).

Demographics

As of the census of 2000, there were 602 people, 257 households, and 168 families residing in the town. The racial makeup of the town was 93.52% White, 0.17% Black or African American, 1.16% Native American, 0.17% Asian, and 4.98% from two or more races. 0.33% of the population were Hispanic or Latino of any race.

There were 257 households, out of which 30.0% had children under the age of 18 living with them, 49.8% were married couples living together, 12.5% had a female householder with no husband present, and 34.6% were non-families. 33.1% of all households were made up of individuals, and 19.8% had someone living alone who was 65 years of age or older. The average household size was 2.34 and the average family size was 2.99.

In the town, the population was spread out, with 24.8% under the age of 18, 7.6% from 18 to 24, 26.6% from 25 to 44, 23.4% from 45 to 64, and 17.6% who were 65 years of age or older. The median age was 39 years. For every 100 females, there were 87.0 males. For every 100 females age 18 and over, there were 79.8 males.

The median income for a household in the town was $30,875, and the median income for a family was $36,250. Males had a median income of $24,750 versus $16,838 for females. The per capita income for the town was $14,738. About 10.1% of families and 17.6% of the population were below the poverty line, including 21.5% of those under age 18 and 22.9% of those age 65 or over.

Education 
Kinston is home to Kinston High School, whose mascot is the Bulldogs. In 1966 and 1968 the Bulldogs won the Alabama High School Athletic Association Class A state basketball tournament. They won the state title again in 1981.

Notable people
Dean Daughtry, keyboard player
The Dancing Ghost of Grancer Harrison, legendary spirit featured in the book 13 Alabama Ghosts and Jeffrey
Brandon Martin, Race Car Driver and Rights Activist

References 

Towns in Coffee County, Alabama
Towns in Alabama
Enterprise–Ozark micropolitan area